CopyCat Killers is a documentary-style television series that investigates real-life crimes that appear to be copied from actual Hollywood movies. The series debuted in 2016 and is broadcast in the United States by Reelz.

Episodes featured
For its third season, premiering on Reelz on February 2, 2019, CopyCat Killers''' new hour long episodes have been slated to examine CopyCat deaths based on movies and television shows including Slender Man, Casino, Twilight, A Nightmare on Elm Street and Fight Club''.

Season 1
 01. Scream - Murder of Cassie Jo Stoddart
 02. Natural Born Killers - Ben Daris and Sarah Edmondson
 03. Fatal Attraction - Carolyn Warmus
 04. Heathers - Murder of Skylar Neese
 05. Rambo - Christopher Dorner
 06. American Psycho - Elliot Rodger
 07. Taxi Driver - John Hinckley Jr.
 08. Hannibal - Armin Meiwes
 09. Saw - Death of Brian Wells
 10. Freddy vs. Jason - Daniel Gonzalez
 11. Dexter - Mark Twitchell
 12. The Talented Mr. Ripley - Christian Gerhartsreiter
 13. Queen of the Damned - Allan Menzies

Season 2
 14. The Dark Knight - James Holmes
 15. The Matrix - John Muhammad and Lee Boyd Malvo
 16. Breaking Bad - Jason Hart
 17. The Basketball Diaries - Michael Carneal
 18. Robocop - Nathaniel White
 19. Halloween - Jake Evans
 20. The Sopranos - Jason Bautista
 21. Child's Play - Murder of Suzanne Capper
 22. Dirty Harry - Hi-Fi murders
 23. Reservoir Dogs - Allan Bentley
 24. X-Men - Jed Allen
 25. Deliverance - Albert Fentress
 26. The Purge - Jonathan Cruz
 27. The Omen - Sean Sellers
 28. Billionaire Boys Club - Lyle and Erik Menendez
 29. The Collector - Leonard Lake and Charles Ng
 30. Fear - Erin Caffey
 31. The Fisher King - George Hennard
 32. Kill Bill - Marcin Kasprzak

Season 3
 33. Primal Fear - Janice Orndoff
 34. The Legend of Lizzie Borden - James Cushing 
 35. Casino - Matt Baker 
 36. Money Train - Vincent Ellerbe and James Irons 
 37. Slenderman - Slender Man stabbing
 38. Basic Instinct - Murder of Jun Lin
 39. The Exorcist III - Jeffrey Dahmer
 40. The Silence of the Lambs - Michael Hernandez 
 41. Tangled - Murder of Dee Dee Blanchard
 42. Forensic Files - Ari Squire 
 43. A Nightmare on Elm Street - Jason Moore 
 44. Goodfellas - Joe Post 
 45. Saw VI - Matthew Tinling 
 46. Bride of Chucky - Elena Lobacheva
 47. A Clockwork Orange - Chelsea O'Mahoney 
 48. Texas Chain Saw Massacre - Robert Elmer Kleason
 49. American Horror Story - Brittney Jade Dwyer
 50. Twilight - Kim Edwards and Lucas Markham

References

External links

2010s American documentary television series
English-language television shows
Forensic science in popular culture
Reelz original programming
Television series featuring reenactments
Television shows about death